Salad Days may refer to:

Salad days, an idiomatic expression, originally from Shakespeare.
Salad Days (musical), a 1954 musical by Julian Slade and Dorothy Reynolds
Salad Days (manga), a romantic shōnen manga
Salad Days (Adrian Belew album)
Salad Days (Mac DeMarco album)
 "Salad Days (Are Here Again)", a song by Procol Harum, from their debut album Procol Harum
Salad Days (EP), an EP by Minor Threat, or the title song
Salad Days (1958 film), an Australian TV play
Salad Days (2014 film), a documentary by Scott Crawford
Sam Peckinpah's "Salad Days", a Monty Python sketch
Salad Days, a recording studio operated by Brian McTernan
"Salad Days", a song by Young Marble Giants from Colossal Youth
Salad Days, a  novel by Charles Romalotti
The Salad Days, volume 1 of the autobiography by Douglas Fairbanks, Jr.
Salad Days, 1928 novel by Theodora Benson
Salad Days (in English translation), 1980 novel by Françoise Sagan

See also
Salad (disambiguation)